The following is the complete list of Y B Normal? episodes. Y B Normal? premiered on September 15, 1998, and aired 19 episodes over two seasons.

Seasons

Season 1 (1998)

Season 2 (1999)

Y B Normal?